John Stalberg Jr. is an American film director and screenwriter.

Career

Stalberg directed a short film in 2005 entitled Mr. Dramatic which begun his professional filmmaking career.

Stalberg's feature directorial debut High School premiered at the Sundance Film Festival, and was distributed theatrically in North America by Anchor Bay Entertainment on June 1, 2012.

Stalberg next directed Crypto (film) starring Beau Knapp, Alexis Bledel and Kurt Russell.

Stalberg then directed Bad Hombres (film) starring Diego Tinoco, Hemky Madera, Thomas Jane and Tyrese Gibson, Luke Hemsworth, Nick Cassavetes and Paul Johansson.

Stalberg next directed Muzzle (film) starring Aaron Eckhart and Stephen Lang.

References

External links

Year of birth missing (living people)
Living people
American film directors
American male screenwriters